Beverly is a city in Essex County, Massachusetts, and a suburb of Boston. The population was 42,670 at the time of the 2020 United States Census. A resort, residential, and manufacturing community on the Massachusetts North Shore, Beverly includes Ryal Side, North Beverly, Montserrat, Beverly Farms and Prides Crossing. Beverly is a rival of Marblehead for the title of being the "birthplace of the U.S. Navy"

History

Native Americans inhabited what would become northeastern Massachusetts for thousands of years before European colonization of the Americas. At the time of contact in the early 1600s the area that would become Beverly was between an important Naumkeag settlement in present-day Salem and Agawam settlements on Cape Ann, with probable indigenous settlement sites at the mouth of the Bass River. During the early contact period virgin soil epidemics ravaged native populations, reducing the indigenous population within the present boundaries of Beverly from an estimated 200 to less than 50 if any survivors.

Europeans under Roger Conant's leadership first colonized the area in 1626 as part of the Massachusetts Bay Colony. Initially part of Salem, Beverly would be set off and officially incorporated in 1668, when it was named after Beverley, the county town of the East Riding of Yorkshire, England. Surviving from the settlement's early history is the Balch House, built, according to dendrochronological testing performed in 2006, about 1679.

English colonists did not initially seek permission from indigenous inhabitants to settle in Beverly, however when Charles II revoked colonial charters to establish the Dominion of New England in 1684, Beverly joined a number of Massachusetts municipalities in seeking out heirs to local sachems and paying them ex post facto in order to establish a right to the land. So it was that in 1686 the town selectmen agreed to pay six pounds, six shillings, and eight pence to three grandchildren of Masconomet, last sachem of the Agawam. They did not pay this sum until 1700.

The first ship commissioned for the US military, by the US Army (the US Navy had yet to exist), was the armed schooner USS Hannah under the command of Captain Nicholson Broughton. It was outfitted at Glover's Wharf and first sailed from Beverly Harbor on September 5, 1775. For this reason Beverly calls itself the "Birthplace of America's Navy."  (Marblehead makes a similar claim, in part, because Broughton was from there and belonged to the Marblehead Regiment. Additionally, official US Navy history and the naval history of Rhode Island contradict this.) The Hannah can be found on the patch of the city's police department.

Beverly has been called the "birthplace of the American Industrial Revolution," as the site of the first cotton mill in America (1787), and largest cotton mill of its time. The town is the home of one of the country's first Sunday schools (which was built in 1810). Beverly was incorporated as a city in 1894.

In 1902, the United Shoe Machinery Corporation built a quarter-mile (400 m) stretch of factory buildings in Beverly. The stretch was an early landmark example of reinforced concrete construction, devised by concrete pioneer Ernest L. Ransome. In 1906 it went into production. Closed in 1987, the complex was bought by Cummings Properties in 1996, and developed into a campus of hi-tech companies and medical offices. Parker Brothers, makers of Monopoly and other games, has offices in Beverly. The city is also home to the Landmark School, known worldwide for the education it provides for students with learning disabilities.

President William Howard Taft rented a house for the summer White House from Mrs. Maria Evans in Beverly. In the summers of 1909 and 1910, he lived in a house located at  what is now the site of the Italian Garden in Lynch Park, the city's principal public park, and in 1911 and 1912 he rented a different house a mile (1600 m) away, "Parramatta", from Mrs. Robert Peabody. Beverly Hills, California, was named in 1907 after Beverly Farms in Beverly because Taft vacationed there.

Beverly has a former Nike missile site on L. P. Henderson Road, immediately east of the Beverly Municipal Airport. This site was in operation from March 1957 until August 1959, when the Army handed it over to the National Guard. It is now used by Beverly as a storage site and is under the scrutiny of many environmental organizations, as it and the surrounding areas—such as Casco Chemical—have polluted the groundwater, which could be potentially hazardous to the nearby Wenham Lake water supply.

In 1984, the deadliest arson fire in Massachusetts history occurred at the Elliott Chambers, a low-rent rooming house located on the corner of Rantoul and Elliott Streets in downtown Beverly. 15 people died as a result of the fire.

In 2020, Jack Mullarkey, a longtime local fencing coach who had been on suspension for two years, after a two-year investigation by the United States Center for SafeSport was banned for life from USA Fencing for alleged sexual misconduct with a minor. He was the owner of the 3MB Fencing Club in Beverly, which operated out of a gym at the Waring School, and had coached fencing for three decades on Cape Ann and the North Shore.

Geography
Beverly is located on the North Shore, the name given to communities north of Boston along Massachusetts Bay. There are many smaller coves,  as well as two islands, the Great and Little Misery Islands, which are part of the city. From Woodbury Point westward lies Beverly Harbor, which lies at the mouth of the Danvers River. The Bass River empties into the Danvers River from within the city. Several other small streams lie within the city as well. A large portion of Wenham Lake, as well as several other lakes and ponds lie within the city. The city has its own city forest and reservation land as well.

Much of the western half of the city is relatively urbanized, while the eastern part of the city (roughly from Woodbury Point east) is more rural. Beverly is home to several parks, five beaches, the Beverly Golf & Tennis Club (est. 1910) and two yacht clubs, Jubilee Yacht Club in Beverly Harbor and Bass Haven Yacht Club along the Bass River.

Besides Massachusetts Bay to the south, Beverly is bordered by Manchester-by-the-Sea to the east, Wenham to the north, Danvers to the west and Salem to the south. Beverly and Salem are separated by the Danvers River and Beverly Harbor, with three bridges, the Veterans Memorial Bridge (former location of the historic Essex Bridge), the MBTA railroad bridge, and the Kernwood Bridge, connecting the two cities.

Climate

Demographics

As of the census of 2020, there were 42,670 people and 16,568 households in the city. The racial makeup of the city was 82.3% White, 4.0% African American, 0.1% Native American, 9.3% Asian, 0.0% Pacific Islander, and 3.1% from two or more races. 5.4% of the population were Hispanic or Latino of any race.

There were 16,158 households in the city. The average household size was 2.39 and the average family size was 3.02.

19.0% of residents were under the age of 18, and 81.0% were over the age of 18. 17.7% were 65 years of age or older. The median age was 40.6 years. For every 100 females, there were 88.4 males.

The median household income was $84,354. The per capita income for the city was $47,494.

Economy

Major employers

 Axcelis Technologies
 Crane Aerospace
 Microsoft
 Orchard Brands, owner of Blair and other catalogs and e-commerce sites
 Zipcar

Arts and culture

Points of interest

 The Beverly Cotton Manufactory site, the first cotton mill in America. The monument sits in North Beverly next to the Veterans Memorial and North Beverly fire station.
 The Cabot Street Cinema Theatre, boasted the world's longest running magician's show; Le Grand David Spectacular Magic Company ran from February 1977 through May 2012. The theater is early 20th-century style and shows films on a regular basis. The Cabot was purchased in 2014 to save it from demolition, and a board of directors created. In 2015 the Cabot Theatre was renovated and now hosts concerts in addition to movies and other community events.
 The Larcom Theatre, an historic multipurpose music and performing arts theatre in Downtown Beverly. Built in 1912, the 560-seat restored vintage theatre is known for its acoustics, and was built by the Ware brothers (architects of the Cabot Theatre).
 Harry Ball Field, home of the Beverly Little League—first and oldest little league in Massachusetts
 Hurd Stadium (home of the Beverly Panthers)
 John Balch House
 John Cabot House (1781)
 Exercise Conant House (1695)
 John Hale House
 Lynch Park & Beaches, located in the city's Cove section, is a popular summer spot for swimming, kayaking, sun bathing, and picnics.
 The North Shore Music Theatre, offering a program of musicals and celebrity concerts
 The Odd Fellows' Hall, on the corner of Cabot and Broadway streets
 Montserrat College of Art

Education
The city has five K–4 elementary schools: Ayers Ryal Side, Centerville, Cove, Hannah, and North Beverly. The city's sole middle school is Beverly Middle School, which finished construction in 2018. Beverly Middle School serves residents in grades 5–8.

Beverly High School is a grade 9–12 public high school located in Beverly. It was founded in 1858, and currently enrolls over 1300 students. In September 2011, construction was completed on a new academic building, which is now in use by students and faculty. Northshore Academy offers an alternative high school provision in Beverly.

Prior to the current state of Beverly's schools, Briscoe served as a middle and high school. Constructed in 1923, the historic building lies near downtown Beverly. Its use for high school students from 1923 to 1964 came to an end when it was transformed to the towns Junior High School, serving grades 6–8. There, it lasted until 2017 when the newly built Beverly Middle School took in the students.

Beverly is home to several K–12 private schools, including New England Academy, Landmark School, Harborlight-Stoneridge Montessori School, Kindercare Learning Center, Beverly School for the Deaf, Saints Academy, the Bright Horizons School, The Waring School, Glen Urquhart School, Shore Country Day, Mrs. Alexander's School, and several others.

The city is home to Endicott College, which offers 23 bachelor programs, 27 concentrations, and 27 minors. Master programs are offered in business, education, nursing, computer science, and political science. Beverly is also home of Montserrat College of Art, a private four-year visual arts college.

Infrastructure

Transportation
Route 128, the chief circumferential highway of the Boston area, crosses Beverly from east to west and connects the city to Interstate 95 and U.S. Route 1 in Peabody. Route 1A passes through Beverly from south to north, along main streets in downtown Beverly. The city is also the terminus of four different state routes: Route 22, which heads northeast from Route 1A; Route 62, which heads west from Route 127; Route 97, which parts with Route 1A northwest of downtown before heading north; and Route 127 which heads east from Route 22.

Beverly is the site of the split between the separate lines of the Newburyport/Rockport Line of the MBTA Commuter Rail, which provides service to Boston's North Station. South of the junction lies Beverly Depot near downtown, which is accessible along both lines.  Along the Newburyport portion of the line is the North Beverly stop, just south of the Wenham town line. Along the Rockport portion of the line are three stops, Montserrat, Prides Crossing and Beverly Farms.  Additionally, MBTA bus Route 451 serves the city, with service to downtown Beverly and Salem from the North Beverly station. A local bus route called the Beverly Shoppers Shuttle serves downtown and western Beverly, and is contracted through the Cape Ann Transportation Authority. Beverly is home to Beverly Municipal Airport, though parts of the airfield itself lie within Danvers, as well as a very small portion of the north runway in Wenham. Logan International Airport provides the nearest national and international air service.

Notable people

 Henry Adams, historian; lived in the Beverly Farms neighborhood while writing his works on Albert Gallatin
 David Alward, former premier of the Canadian province of New Brunswick
 John Appleton, congressman
 Frederick L. Ashworth, naval weaponer aboard Bockscar which dropped the atomic bomb on Nagasaki, Japan
 John Baker, first Mayor
 Jacob Bannon, artist, musician
 Will Barnet, artist
 Albert J. Beveridge, American Historian, Pulitzer Prize winner and US Senator from Indiana
 Benjamin C. Bradlee, Washington Post editor; summer resident; began his newspaper career as a copy boy for the Beverly Evening Times in 1937
 James F. Cahill, one of the first scuba divers and one of the first UDTs
 Nik Caner-Medley, professional basketball player for Maccabi Tel Aviv
 Bobby Carpenter, former NHL hockey player
 Rita Colwell, 2006 National Medal of Science recipient
 Nathan Dane, lawyer and congressman
 Le Grand David, magician
 Esther Earl, Internet vlogger and activist
 David Ferriero, Archivist of the United States
 Pete Frates, ALS advocate, ALS Ice Bucket Challenge pioneer
 Henry Clay Frick, industrialist (summer resident)
 John Hale, minister at the Salem witch trials
 David E. Harris, the first African American commercial airline pilot and pilot captain for a major U.S. commercial airline 
 Kerry Healey, former lieutenant-governor
 Joshua Herrick, congressman
 Oliver Wendell Holmes, Sr., author (summer resident)
 Oliver Wendell Holmes, Jr., Associate Justice of the United States Supreme Court (summer resident)
 Corey Johnson, first HIV-positive member of the New York City Council (elected 2013)
 Lucy Larcom, poet
 Jack Leathersich, MLB player for the New York Mets
 Mary Lou Lord, musician
 David Lundquist, former professional baseball pitcher and current pitching coach for the Philadelphia Phillies
 Alfred Marshall, businessman, founder of Marshalls 
 Greg Marshall, former NFL and CFL defensive lineman and coach, current Head Coach for the University of Toronto Varsity Blues football
 David McWane, musician (Big D and the Kids Table)
 Angie Miller, singer-songwriter and American Idol contestant
 David Morse, actor
 J. Foster Ober, architect, born in Beverly, designed Odd Fellows' Hall in 1874
 Kevin O'Connor, television host
 Benjamin Osgood Peirce, teacher
 Howard Petrie, actor
 Joanna Quiner, sculptor
 Derek Rae, television sports commentator
 Peter Rockwell, sculptor
 William Howard Taft, U.S. president and Chief Justice (summer resident)
 Elbridge Trask, frontiersman and mountain man
 John Updike, author
 Joseph Vittori, awarded the Medal of Honor for his actions in the Korean War
 Herbert Woodbury (privateer)
 Nicole Woods Current member of USA Field Hockey 's Women's National Team 
 Philip Gordon Wylie, author

Film appearances

See also

References

Further reading

External links

 
 
 
 1830 Map of Beverly, by T. Wilson Flagg.
 1872 Atlas of Essex County Map of Beverly, plate 97.
 1872 Atlas of Essex County Map of Beverly Cove, plate 95, at the bottom of the page of the Map of Wenham.
 1884 Atlas of Essex County, Map of Beverly, plate 68–69.
 1907 Atlas of Beverly, by George H. Walker.
 1919 North Shore Atlas. Click on map for much larger image.

 
1626 establishments in Massachusetts
Cities in Essex County, Massachusetts
Cities in Massachusetts
Populated coastal places in Massachusetts
Populated places established in 1626